The Working Group 6 on Human Work Interaction Design (HWID) is part of the International Federation for Information Processing (IFIP) and specifically of its technical committee 13  on Human-Computer Interaction (HCI). It focuses on the integration of work analysis and interaction design methods for pervasive and smart workplaces. The group was founded by Annelise Mark-Pejtersen, Torkil Clemmensen and Rikke Orngreen in 2005. HWID has its roots and inspiration from the 70’s Cognitive Work Analysis (CWA) methods. Today, HWID is a lightweight version of CWA, addressing the concept of Work in HCI. The mission of the group is to empower users by designing smarter workplaces, in many different work domains. In 2015, the group counted more than 60 members.

Aims 
The aims of the HWID working group are:

 To encourage empirical studies and conceptualisations of the interaction among humans, their variegated social contexts and the technology they use both within and across these contexts.
 Promote the use  of knowledge, concepts, methods and techniques that enables user studies to procure a better apprehension of the complex interplay between individual, social and organisational contexts and thereby a better understanding of how and why people work in the ways they do.
 Promote a better understanding of the relationship between work-domain based empirical studies and iterative design of prototypes and new technologies.
 Establish a network of researchers, practitioners and domain/subject matter experts working within this field.

Scope 
The group provides the basis for an improved cross-disciplinary co-operation and mutual inspiration among researchers, but also leads to a number of new research initiatives and developments, as well as to an increased awareness of HWID in existing HCI educations. Complexity is a key notion in the working group, it is not a priori defined or limited to any particular domains. A main target of the work group is the analysis of and the design for the variety of complex work and life contexts found in different business. It studies how technology is changing human life and work contexts in numerous, multi-faceted ways:

 Interfaces between collaborating individuals; advanced communication networks
 Small and large-scale distributed systems
 Multimedia and embedded technologies
 Mobile technologies and advanced "intelligent" robots
 Communication, collaboration, and problem solving
 Large information spaces, variability, discretion, learning, and information seeking
 Methods, theories, tools, techniques and prototype design on an experimental basis

Officers 
 Chair: Barbara Rita Barricelli - Università degli Studi di Brescia, Italy
 Vice Chair: Torkil Clemmensen - Copenhagen Business School, Denmark  
 Vice Chair: José Abdelnour-Nocera - University of West London, United Kingdom
 Vice Chair: Arminda Guerra Lopes - Polytechnic Institute of Castelo Branco, Portugal
 Vice Chair: Pedro Campos - University of Madeira, Portugal
 Vice Chair: Ganesh Bhutkar - Vishwakarma Institute of Technology, India
 Vice Chair: Xiangang Qin - Beijing University of Posts and Telecommunications, China
 Vice Chair: Judith Molka-Danielsen - Molde University College, Norway
 Secretary Officer: Frederica Gonçalves - University of Madeira, Portugal

External links 
 International Federation for Information Processing
 TC13 WG6 Human Work Interaction Design

International Federation for Information Processing